The NATO J band is the designation given to the radio frequencies from 10 to 20 GHz (equivalent to wavelengths between 3 and  1.5 cm). Since 1992 frequency allocations, allotment and assignments are in line to NATO Joint Civil/Military Frequency Agreement (NJFA).
However, in order to identify military radio spectrum requirements, e.g. for crises management planning, training, Electronic warfare activities, or in military operations, this system is still in use.

References

Radio spectrum